Mourning Golden Morning is the third studio album by Swedish post-rock band EF. It was released through And The Sound Records in the UK and in Sweden, and by Kapitän Platte in Germany.

Track listing

References

2010 albums
Ef (band) albums